Nurabad Rural District is a rural district (dehestan) in Garkan-e Jonubi District, Mobarakeh County, Isfahan Province, Iran. At the 2006 census, its population was 9,828, in 2,515 families.  The rural district has 15 villages.

References 

Rural Districts of Isfahan Province
Mobarakeh County